The 1813 Delaware gubernatorial election was held on October 5, 1813.

Incumbent Democratic-Republican Governor Joseph Haslet was not eligible for re-election under the Delaware Constitution of 1792. 

Federalist nominee Daniel Rodney defeated Democratic-Republican nominee James Riddle with 55.20% of the vote.

General election

Results

References

Bibliography
 
 
 

1813
Delaware
Gubernatorial